The 1992 United States Senate election in Pennsylvania was held on November 3, 1992. Incumbent Republican U.S. Senator Arlen Specter narrowly won re-election to a third term, garnering just fifty-one percent of the vote in what was described by The Philadelphia Inquirer as a "massive turnout for Bill Clinton."

Specter's campaign against Democrat Lynn Yeakel, which was widely reported by nationwide newspapers as having been harmed by his treatment of University of Oklahoma law professor Anita Hill as she testified against U.S. circuit court judge Clarence Thomas during his Senate confirmation hearings for the U.S. Supreme Court, was aided by a combination of support for him from Philadelphia-area voters and weak turnout in the Pittsburgh area for Yeakel.

Republican primary

Candidates
Stephen Freind, State Representative (from Delaware County)
Arlen Specter, incumbent U.S. Senator (from Philadelphia County)

Campaign
Despite his powerful position in the Senate, Specter had numerous problems entering the election. A moderate who generally received only tepid support from his party's conservative wing, he was criticized by the right for opposing Ronald Reagan's nomination of Robert Bork to the Supreme Court. Specter subsequently faced a primary challenge from ultra-conservative State Representative Stephen Freind; although the incumbent won handily, the battle was expensive and featured many damaging attack ads.

Democratic primary

Candidates
Robert E. Colville, District Attorney of Allegheny County (from Allegheny County)
Freddy Mann Friedman
Mark Singel, Lieutenant Governor of Pennsylvania (from Cambria County)
Philip Valenti
Lynn Yeakel, millionaire director of women's studies at Drexel University College of Medicine and daughter of former U.S. Congressman Porter Hardy of Virginia (from Delaware County)

Results
Yeakel won the five-way primary with 45% of the vote, easily defeating the endorsed candidate, Lieutenant Governor Mark Singel, in an election cycle dubbed by pundits as the "year of the woman".

General election

Candidates
John Perry (Libertarian)
 Arlen Specter, incumbent U.S. Senator (from Philadelphia County) (Republican)
 Lynn Yeakel, millionaire director of women's studies at Drexel University College of Medicine and daughter of former U.S. Representative Porter Hardy Jr. (from Delaware County) (Democratic)

Campaign 
Senator Specter was highly targeted by women's groups for his involvement in the Clarence Thomas proceedings; during his questioning of Anita Hill, Specter appeared to show no sympathy for her allegations of sexual harassment. Furthermore, President Bush's popularity was rapidly declining in the state over high unemployment rates, and was subsequently dragging down Republican candidates.

Polls put Yeakel ahead of Specter by double digits, but Specter ran a campaign that was praised by political analysts for being almost flawless. Despite Yeakel's personal wealth, her inexperience in politics led to fundraising problems; Specter outspent her by a two-to-one margin. This kept Yeakel from running television ads until September 23, a month and a half before the election. The moderate Specter portrayed Yeakel, despite her liberal attitude, as a member of an elitist blue-blood family. He emphasized her father's votes against the Civil Rights Act of 1964 while in Congress, her affiliation with an all-white country club, and her church's minister's vocal criticism of the Israeli government. It did not help matters that a newspaper strike in Pittsburgh crippled Yeakel's ability to introduce herself to voters in the southwest.

Despite her mistakes, including a frequent tendency to mispronounce the names of places in which she was campaigning, Yeakel continued to perform solidly.

Results

On Election Day, Yeakel captured by large numbers the traditional Democratic strongholds of the state, such as Pittsburgh, Scranton, and Erie; however, Specter undercut Yeakel's support in the state's most critical Democratic county: Philadelphia. Specter campaigned hard in black neighborhoods and received the endorsement of the NAACP. Furthermore, he capitalized on the ambivalence of many Philadelphia Democratic leaders to Yeakel. A self-described reform candidate, Yeakel distanced herself from the city's ward leaders. As a result, while Yeakel carried Philadelphia by a solid 122,000-vote margin, she significantly underperformed Bill Clinton's total there.

Also critical to the campaign was Specter's grass-roots involvement in Yeakel's base, the traditionally GOP, but Democratic-trending, suburbs of Philadelphia. Yeakel also significantly underperformed in the northeast and southwest. She barely won Lackawanna County, home to Scranton, and barely lost Allegheny County, home to Pittsburgh; as mentioned above, she easily carried the cities themselves.

See also
 1992 United States Senate elections

References

1992 Pennsylvania elections
Pennsylvania
1992